The Ambassador from Israel to Liechtenstein is Israel's foremost diplomatic representative in Liechtenstein.

List of ambassadors

Ifat Reshef 2021-
Jacob Keidar (Non-Resident, Bern) 2016 -

Former Ambassadors
Consul General Yitzhak Mayer (Non-Resident, Zürich) 1979
Consul General Gavriel Gavrieli (Non-Resident, Zürich) 1976 - 1979

References

Liechtenstein
Israel